Copinula River (Rio Copinula) is a medium stream in the Sonsonate department of El Salvador, which has moderate to large quantities of fresh water year round, especially from early May through October.

A stream with a similar name, Copinulapa River (Rio Copinulapa), is also located in El Salvador, near the municipality of Nombre de Jesús in the Chalatenango department.

References

External links

Río Copinula: El Salvador at geographic.org.
Río Copinula at getamap.net.
Rio Copinula at myfishmaps.com.
Rio copinula at tageo.com.

Rivers of El Salvador